South Park is a neighborhood of Louisville, Kentucky, centered along South Park Road and Fairdale Road.

References

Neighborhoods in Louisville, Kentucky